Medpace Holdings, Inc. (alt. MedPace) is a midsize, clinical contract research organization (CRO) based in Cincinnati, Ohio. It provides services for Phase I-IV of drug and medical device development services including regulatory services and central laboratory services. The company started trading stock as a public firm in 2016.

History 

Dr. August Troendle founded Medpace in Cincinnati, Ohio in 1992 as Medical Research Services. Troendle first became interested in the CRO sector after working in both the regulatory and pharmaceutical area.  He began his career as a reviewer with the FDA, specializing in the development of lipid lowering therapies to treat high cholesterol.

With a team of industry physicians, Dr. Jonathan Issacsohn and Dr. Evan Stein completed many early studies while at Medpace and Medpace Reference Laboratories on the use of statin therapies for the treatment of hypercholesterolemia. Another Medpace physician, the late Dr. David Orloff was regarded as an industry opinion leader in the study of metabolic diseases - most specifically diabetes and obesity. Troendle was honored for his work as a Medpace founder in 2012 by the Cincinnati Chamber of Commerce.

Medpace completed construction on a new campus in 2012 in Madisonville, a neighborhood on the eastern side of Cincinnati. The project encompassed revitalizing an urban brownfield site formerly occupied by NuTone,  and creating a state of the art LEED certified campus.

Acquisitions 

2007-Medpace acquires Monax in the Czech Republic
2009-Medpace acquires PharmaBrains AG in Switzerland
2010-Medpace acquires Symbios, a medical device consultancy in Minneapolis, MN
2010-Medpace acquires Medical Consulting Dr. Schlichtiger, GmbH, in Germany
2012-Medpace acquires MediTech BV, a medical device consultancy in the Netherlands.

Ownership 
Three years later, in February 2014, CCMP auctioned their 80% stake; the winner was won by Cinven, who paid . In August 2017, Medpace went became a publicly-traded company with its initial public offering, selling 8,050,000 shares of common stock.

Recognition 
In May 2009, Medpace was recognized by CenterWatch, a CRO industry publication, as a top CRO by investigative sites.

In 2011 and 2012 Medpace was given the Eagle Award, an industry award by investigative sites for criteria including professionalism, partnership, efficiencies and financial considerations

Further reading

References

External links 

Contract research organizations
Health care companies established in 1992
Companies based in Cincinnati
Companies listed on the Nasdaq
2016 initial public offerings
1992 establishments in Ohio